Max Dombrowka (born 24 March 1992) is a German professional footballer who plays as a defender for SV Meppen.

Career
Dombrowka joined Bayern Munich's youth team in 2003, and broke into the reserve squad during the 2010–11 season, making his debut in a 1–0 defeat against SV Sandhausen in September 2010. He made 49 appearances for Bayern II before joining Rot-Weiss Essen in July 2012. In 2015, he joined Regionalliga Bayern side SpVgg Unterhaching.

References

External links
 
 

1992 births
Living people
Sportspeople from Ingolstadt
German footballers
Footballers from Bavaria
Association football defenders
Germany youth international footballers
FC Bayern Munich II players
Rot-Weiss Essen players
SpVgg Unterhaching players
SV Meppen players
3. Liga players
Regionalliga players